Viktor Kudryavtsev may refer to:

Viktor Kudriavtsev, figure skating coach and choreographer
Viktor Kudryavtsev (guitarist), guitarist for the band Zemlyane